Jeffrey Prothero (March 15, 1956 – November 16, 2016) was an American computer programmer.  He was the author of Citadel, arguably the first virtual world system and one of the longest-running open source projects; the Digital Anatomist software, better known as the Visible Human Project; the original Pascal strek.pas Star Trek game program; the first Loglan parsers; and Mythryl, a production-grade port of SML/NJ.

Prothero used the screenname "Cynbe ru Taren" online. Cynbe ru Taren is the name of a fictional alien in Poul Anderson's 1964 science fiction novel The Star Fox. In the novel Cynbe ru Taren is an "Aleriona Intellect Master of the Garden of War, fleet admiral, and military strategist of the Grand Commission of Negotiators."  

He died on November 16, 2016 after a battle with colorectal cancer.

Early life and education
Prothero was born on March 15, 1956, in London, Ontario, to academic parents, John (Jack) and Joyce Prothero. He attended kindergarten in Ontario; first form in London, England; second form in Cambridge, England; third grade in Boston, Massachusetts; and fourth through twelfth in Seattle, Washington.

Prothero lived in Seattle, programming and designing virtual worlds, until 1997, when he moved to Austin, Texas, to live with his wife Allucquere Rosanne “Sandy” Stone, who is a professor at the University of Texas at Austin.  Beginning in 1998, Prothero and Stone divided their time between Santa Cruz and Tahoe City, California, while maintaining a residence in Austin during school sessions.

The Digital Anatomist/Visible Human
Prothero enrolled at the University of Washington in 1974, spending most of his time at the Campus Computer Center.  He learned his craft at the Visual Techniques Laboratory, using a PDP10 and a Mohawk Data 600LPM printer.  Before long he was working as a full-time programmer for the department of Biological Structure, headed by John W. Sundsten and John Prothero.  He wrote the Skandha visualization system, which assembled microscopic sections of biological material into three-dimensional images which could be manipulated minutely to reveal details of the interior of such objects as the human body.

The Biological Structure department named this effort the Digital Anatomist project.  Its image database was supplied with raw digital material by Wolfgang Rauschning, a Swedish researcher in microtomy and microscopy who specialized in producing ultrathin tissue cross-sections. Rauschning's method was subtractive, ablating a layer of carefully frozen tissue only a few thousand molecules thick, coating the exposed surface with a glycerol mixture which Rauschning adapted to the specific tissue, photographing the surface at high resolution, and repeating until the tissue was completely sectioned.  Rauschning sent each image via Internet to the Digital Anatomist database at the University of Washington in Seattle.

His method produced extremely high resolution digital images in vivid color with almost none of the distortion which would normally be caused by the displacement forces generated by the action of a conventional microtome at extreme thinness settings. Sundsten, Jeffrey Prothero and John Prothero asked Rauschning to include fiduciaries in his sections, which enabled Prothero's Skandha 3D visualization software to assemble the huge digital database into three-dimensional flythrough-capable anatomical images with extremely fine grain. The group made Prothero's tapes of the 3D reconstructions freely available on their website. 

Hearing of this work, the National Library of Medicine issued a Call for Proposals for a national 3D anatomical reconstruction database which would later become the Visible Human project.  To the astonishment of the Digital Anatomist group, they found that the University of Colorado had made a strong bid for the contract using Prothero’s data tapes as examples of its own work.

Technically there was nothing illegal about doing so, since the tapes were freely available, but Colorado's bid did not mention their provenance. Colorado won the contract, and continued to display Prothero’s work without attribution for the first three years of the contract, although its later work was not based on the methodology developed by the Digital Anatomist project (Colorado's specimen sectioning system involved something rather like a bandsaw), and produced considerably coarser-grained reconstructions.

Shortly afterward, the chief scientists of the UW Digital Anatomist project resigned in frustration.

Citadel BBS
In 1980, Prothero completed building his second computer, a Heath H89 with a homebrew power supply and a Silent 700 acoustic coupler.  He began writing code on December 14 and released the first version of Citadel on December 24.  The first release used a phone number that connected to the hardware in Prothero's study.  At first he did not call the program Citadel: instead he named it Ode, after its phone number, the acronym of which was ODE-DATA, later changed to ODD-DATA at the suggestion of friends.

The version of Citadel released December 24, 1980 was written in C and was fast, responsive, self-maintaining, and ran on a 90KB floppy disc.  The world consisted of a collection of rooms connected by “clues”.  Since some of the rooms were invisible, each clue included the name of the clued room as part of the clue. (For details of the Citadel room architecture see the Citadel software page; for details of the Citadel program architecture see below.)

Even at its most early stage, the new social forms enabled by the Citadel system allowed users to display aberrant and antisocial behavior which is now well-known among virtual world researchers, including griefing, unresolvable arguments, and misreadings of innocuous remarks resulting in flame wars.  When hardware problems finally brought the system down, Prothero felt that he had had enough of peacekeeping and wanted to concentrate on programming.  Consequently, he passed the software system on to David Mitchell, a friend who lived on Bainbridge Island, Washington, not far from Prothero’s home. The system Mitchell acquired went on to become the canonical Citadel.

In April 1982 Prothero released Citadel V.2.11 to the C Users Group mailing list.  As a social experiment and to distribute power more broadly, V.2.11 provided for aides, a class of people who were neither sysadmins nor users, but who had partial sysadmin powers.  To afford a measure of accountability, their actions produced an unerasable paper trail.  V.2.11 also implemented a secure database by encrypting it on disc using a simple XOR hash. Prothero continued to make further innovations in the Citadel software before moving on to other projects.

Prothero posted the Citadel source code to the RCP/M archive network in 1990.  The code is cited as one of the longest running open source projects.

References

External links
 Mythryl project
 Jeffrey Prothero's Website

1956 births
2016 deaths
Artificial intelligence researchers
American computer scientists
Programming language researchers
Scientists from Ontario
Canadian emigrants to the United States
Deaths from colorectal cancer
Deaths from cancer in the United States
Loglan